Iain John Hook (1948 – 22 November 2002) was working for the United Nations Relief and Works Agency for Palestine Refugees in the Near East (UNRWA) as project manager in the rebuilding of Jenin Refugee Camp in West Bank, which was home to 13,000 Palestinian refugees. He was shot and killed by an Israel Defense Forces sniper, during a battle in Jenin on 22 November 2002. A United Nations Security Council resolution condemning Israel was vetoed by the United States. In 2005, an English inquest jury returned a verdict of unlawful killing.

Early life
Born in Felixstowe, Suffolk, Hook was married and father of three sons and a daughter; two of his sons are British military officers. Prior to his work for the United Nations, Iain Hook was a British paratrooper. Hook supervised the reconstruction of a hospital complex in Pristina, Kosovo, in 1999, and also worked on projects in East Timor, Afghanistan, and Serbia.

Death and subsequent events

UNRWA work
Iain Hook was working for United Nations Relief and Works Agency for Palestine Refugees in the Near East (UNRWA), which is "created to administer Palestinian refugee camps set up after the 1948 Arab-Israeli war", and which was home to 13,000 Palestinian refugees, as project manager in rebuilding of Jenin refugee camp in West Bank. In October 2002, Hook arrived at the Palestinian refugee camp in Jenin to oversee the rebuilding of the camp.

Death of Iain Hook

On 22 November 2002, Hook left a voice message with Israeli authorities that Palestinian militants ("shabab"-youth) had "knocked a hole in the wall" and "pinned down" his men.  During a gun-battle with Islamic Jihad militants whom Israel says were firing at troops from inside the UN compound, an Israeli military sniper killed Hook. Israeli Army radio claimed that the sniper who killed him mistook his cell phone for a handgun or grenade.  The United Nations stated that there were no gunmen at the compound, and claims that the shooting was a mere mistake; Hook was shot in the back by a sniper with a scoped rifle, from a distance of 20 meters. Co-workers evacuated Hook through the hole in the wall, but he died of a gunshot wound to the abdomen before reaching a hospital.

Ambulance controversy
United Nations immediately arranged an ambulance for patient evacuation but Israeli soldiers on the field delayed the ambulance sent to evacuate Hook and changed its route.

The UNRWA statement was later echoed by then UN secretary-general, Kofi Annan in New York City, while Israel military officials have denied the charge. Socialist Worker stated that the army forced the ambulance to wait 25 minutes while Hook "bled to death".

Diplomatic response
Israeli Foreign Minister Benjamin Netanyahu telephoned the British Foreign Minister, Jack Straw to express regrets over Hook's death.  The United States vetoed "with regret" a United Nation Security Council resolution proposed by Syria condemning Israel for the killing; there were 12 votes in favor of the resolution, and 2 abstentions, in the 15 nation vote. United States ambassador John D. Negroponte said Syria and the Palestinians seemed "more intent on condemning Israeli occupation than on ensuring the safety of United Nations personnel." UN Secretary General Kofi Annan released a statement demanding that Israel punish those responsible for the killing. Israel, however, found that "no criminal act had been committed" and no criminal charges were filed.

More than sixty United Nations workers wrote a letter criticizing Israeli troops for "senseless" and "wanton" behavior, complaining of abuse and humiliation. Israel responded by releasing to newspapers what the New York Times called a "damning intelligence report" alleging UNRWA operations were being used as cover for "Palestinian terrorists", including smuggling arms in UN ambulances and hosting meetings of Tanzim in UN buildings. The United Nations internal report on the matter was the subject of controversy: the initial version stated that peace activists in the compound were bringing young Palestinian men into the compound through a hole in the wall. Following protests by UNWRA staff, the claim was dropped from the report.

Coroner's inquest

Coroner Dr Peter Dean opened the inquest at Ipswich Crown Court. In 2005, Irish activist Caoimhe Butterly gave written eyewitness testimony in the inquest into the killing of Iain Hook by an Israeli military sniper. After the court proceedings jurors unanimously delivered the verdict that the Israeli military was fully accountable for the unlawful killing of Iain Hook. Dr Peter Hansen, former Commissioner General of the UNRWA, said that "over the past four years 13 UNRWA workers, including Mr. Hook, had been shot in similar circumstances by the Israeli army". In a statement after the verdict, Paul Wolstenholme, a colleague of Hook who was in the compound at time of the shooting, said the Israeli sniper would have known he was not a Palestinian. "It was not a case of mistaken identity, it was a deliberate act," he said.

Payment

The Israeli government made an ex gratia payment to the Hook family in an agreement with the British government. The Foreign Office (UK) did not reveal the details under the Freedom of Information Act for "releasing information on the death that could damage Britain's relations with another state", while John Gillan, of the Foreign and Commonwealth Office claimed other information on the death could not be released which is related to the "formulation or development of government policy."

See also
Tom Hurndall – British ISM volunteer fatally wounded in Gaza by IDF sniper, 11 April 2003.
James Miller - British filmmaker fatally shot in Gaza by IDF sniper, 2 May 2003.

References

Further reading
 UNRWA Press Statement
 UNRWA Press Statement

1948 births
2002 deaths
Second Intifada casualties
People from Felixstowe
People killed by Israeli security forces
United Nations operations in the Middle East
British people murdered abroad